Faqibeyglu (also Romanized as Faqībeyglū) is a village in Nazluy-ye Jonubi Rural District, in the Central District of Urmia County, West Azerbaijan Province, Iran. At the 2006 census, its population was 275, in 55 families.

References 

Populated places in Urmia County